Nigel Fairs is a British actor and writer.

He trained at Bretton Hall College and his theatre credits include stage production of Translations at The National Theatre, Inspector Morse in the UK tour of House of Ghosts, Dr Watson in To Kill a Canary  at the Kenton Theatre, Henley), Nurse Ratched in One Flew Over the Cuckoo's Nest at The English Theatre Frankfurt, Christopher Wren in The Mousetrap in the West End, John Haigh in his own award-winning play In Conversation with an Acid Bath Murderer and Gavin in another award-winner, My Gay Best Friend (which he co-wrote with Louise Jameson. Television credits include EastEnders, Emmerdale, Silent Witness and Unforgotten. Film credits include Angels on the Ceiling, In From The Side, Ashens and the Polybius Heist and Do You Have A License To Save This Planet?.

He has also worked for Big Finish Productions, as an actor, writer, director and composer, and was the producer of their Sapphire and Steel and The Tomorrow People ranges. A common style of both ranges is an increase in emotional content, the exploration of ongoing themes and, in the case of The Tomorrow People, long-running story arcs. As well as writing individual stories for both these ranges, he has contributed to the company’s Doctor Who range in February 2007 with  The Blue Tooth, and later The Catalyst and Empathy Games, both starring Louise Jameson. In 2007, he contributed to the short-story collection Short Trips: Snapshots. Prior to his work for Big Finish, he was a regular writer and director for BBV. In 2008 he appeared in the BBV film Zygon: When Being You Just Isn't Enough.

In 2020 he wrote and produced two ongoing audio podcasts dramas, The Pogley Wood Murders and Moira Moments.

Big Finish Productions
His work for Big Finish Productions includes:

As a writer:
 Doctor Who - The Companion Chronicles: The Blue Tooth
 Doctor Who - The Companion Chronicles: The Catalyst
 Doctor Who: Cuddlesome
 Doctor Who - The Companion Chronicles: Empathy Games
 Doctor Who - The Companion Chronicles: The Time Vampire
 Doctor Who - The Companion Chronicles: The Child
 Jago and Litefoot: Jago in Love
 Doctor Who: The Abandoned (with Louise Jameson)
 Doctor Who - Short Trips: Time Tunnel
 Doctor Who - Short Trips: The Toy
 Doctor Who - Short Trips: Prime Winner
 Jago and Litefoot: Jago and Son

As a director:
Sapphire & Steel: Dead Man Walking
Sapphire & Steel: The Mystery of the Missing Hour
Sapphire & Steel: Daisy Chain
Sapphire & Steel: All Fall Down
Sapphire & Steel: The Lighthouse
Sapphire & Steel: The School
Sapphire & Steel: The Surest Poison
Sapphire & Steel: Water Like a Stone
Doctor Who: Scaredy Cat
 Doctor Who - The Companion Chronicles: Mother Russia
 Doctor Who - The Companion Chronicles: Helicon Prime
 Doctor Who - The Companion Chronicles: Old Soldiers
 Doctor Who - The Companion Chronicles: The Catalyst
 Doctor Who - The Companion Chronicles: The Great Space Elevator
 Doctor Who - The Companion Chronicles: Empathy Games
 Doctor Who - The Companion Chronicles: The Transit of Venus
 Doctor Who - The Companion Chronicles: The Magician's Oath
 Doctor Who - The Companion Chronicles: The Glorious Revolution
 Doctor Who - The Companion Chronicles: The Time Vampire
 Doctor Who - The Companion Chronicles: The Child
 Bernice Summerfield: The Adventure of the Diogenes Damsel
Dark Shadows: The Blind Painter

As an actor:
Bernice Summerfield: Walking to Babylon
Bernice Summerfield: Dragons' Wrath
Doctor Who: The Shadow of the Scourge
Doctor Who: Nekromanteia
Gallifrey: Pandora
Dark Shadows: Final Judgement
Ashens and the Polybius Heist

References

External links
 
 Moira Moments podcasts
 Interview with Nigel Fairs
 Anorak Zone interview with Nigel Fairs
 Personal website of Nigel Fairs

English male voice actors
English male stage actors
Year of birth missing (living people)
Living people